Julie Lynne Black-Burns Richards (born September 26, 1970) is an American equestrian. Born in Newnan, Georgia, she won a bronze medal in team  eventing at the 2004 Summer Olympics in Athens, together with Kimberly Severson, John Williams, Darren Chiacchia and Amy Tryon.

References

External links

1970 births
Living people
American female equestrians
Olympic bronze medalists for the United States in equestrian
Equestrians at the 2000 Summer Olympics
Equestrians at the 2004 Summer Olympics
Sportspeople from the Atlanta metropolitan area
People from Newnan, Georgia
Medalists at the 2004 Summer Olympics
21st-century American women